The Inaltéra GTP is a Group 6 sports prototype race car, designed, developed and built by Automobiles Jean Rondeau in 1976.

Development history and technology 
It is the first car Jean Rondeau designed and developed and was completely built (except the engine) in Le Mans, where he himself was born. Its name, Inaltéra, comes from the name of a French wallpaper company that sponsored the team.

The chassis is an aluminum-reinforced steel multi-tubular spaceframe, covered in a fiberglass panel body.

Racing history 
It competed in sports car racing between 1976 and 1978. Three cars were entered by Rondeau himself at the 1977 24 Hours of Le Mans where its best result was an overall 4th-place finish and 1st place of its GTP class. Only one car was entered at the 1978 24 Hours of Le Mans as the Inaltéra sponsorship was cut after the 1977 season and Rondeau had to sell his cars. The car finished 13th overall.

References

Group 6 (racing) cars
Sports prototypes